South Korea competed at the 2012 Winter Youth Olympics in Innsbruck, Austria.

Medalists

Alpine skiing

South Korea qualified 2 athletes.

Boys

Girls

Biathlon

South Korea qualified 2 athletes.

Boys

Girls

Mixed

Bobsleigh

South Korea qualified 2 athletes.

Boys

Cross-country skiing

South Korea qualified 2 athletes.

Boys

Girls

Sprint

Mixed

Curling

South Korea qualified 1 team.

Roster
Skip: Kang Sue-yeon
Third: Yoo Min-hyeon
Second: Kim Eun-bi
Lead: Go Ke-on

Mixed team

Round-robin results

Draw 1

Draw 2

Draw 3

Draw 4

Draw 5

Draw 6

Draw 7

Mixed doubles

Round of 32

Round of 16

Quarterfinals

Semifinals

Bronze medal game

Gold medal game

Figure skating

South Korea qualified 1 athlete.

Boys

Girls

Mixed

Freestyle skiing

South Korea qualified 1 athlete.

Half-pipe

Ice hockey

South Korea qualified 2 athletes.

Boys

Girls

Short track speed skating

South Korea qualified 4 athletes.

Boys

Girls

Mixed

Skeleton

South Korea qualified 1 athlete.

Boys

Snowboarding

South Korea qualified 2 athletes.

While formally listed on the team Jeong Hae-rim was not listed to compete in any events.

Boys

Speed skating

South Korea qualified 4 athletes.

Boys

Girls

See also
South Korea at the 2012 Summer Olympics

References

2012 in South Korean sport
Nations at the 2012 Winter Youth Olympics
South Korea at the Youth Olympics